Craig Cirbus is a former American football player and coach.  He served as the football coach at the University at Buffalo  from 1995 to 2000, compiling a record of 19–47.

Cirbus attended high school at St. Joseph's Collegiate Institute in Tonawanda, New York before playing for the Buffalo Bulls in college. After graduating, he became an assistant coach at Cheektowaga Central High School before serving as an assistant coach under Joe Paterno at Pennsylvania State University.

Cirbus now works as an investment adviser.

Head coaching record

References

Year of birth missing (living people)
Living people
Buffalo Bulls football coaches
Buffalo Bulls football players
Penn State Nittany Lions football coaches
High school football coaches in New York (state)
People from Tonawanda, New York
Sportspeople from Erie County, New York
St. Joseph's Collegiate Institute alumni
Players of American football from New York (state)